100 Feet is a 2008 American horror film written and directed by Eric Red and starring Famke Janssen, Bobby Cannavale, Ed Westwick and Michael Paré.

Plot
Marnie Watson (Famke Jannsen) is being driven home in a police car after killing her abusive husband in self-defense - to be placed under house arrest. She is escorted home by Lou Shanks (Bobby Cannavale), a police officer and former partner of her husband.

The next day a delivery boy Joey (Ed Westwick) arrives with groceries, and Marnie tells him she needs him to come by on a regular basis. Later that night while in bed her husband's face suddenly appears. Frightened, she leaps up and flees from the room. Her husband's ghost, Mike (Michael Paré), pushes her down the stairs. Marnie crawls to the front door setting off the detector. Shanks arrives a short time later and finds her unconscious at the front door. She tells him she fell down the stairs. He asks her if someone is beating her and chastises her for not cleaning up the blood stain which has reappeared on the wall.

Marnie has Joey get her some books from the library about ghosts. She reads that she must get rid of all of Mike's things and begins collecting everything, including the suitcase she threw in the basement. While in the basement, Marnie is attacked by Mike's ghost and dragged down the stairs before she can finally get up and run to safety. Once upstairs, Shanks is knocking at her door after hearing screams, and begins looking throughout the house demanding answers. He claims that Marnie is covering for the real murderer and gets upset at her lack of clarity. In the end he apologizes for not being able to protect her and vows to do everything in his power to protect her now.

Mike's ghost continues to threaten Marnie and she continues to rid the house of his presence. Feeling lonely, Marnie calls Joey in the night and, against her wishes, he runs over and refuses to leave unless she lets him in. They make their way upstairs and have sex, during which Marnie sees Mike's ghost and continues, seeming unfazed, almost happy that the ghost is watching. Everything seems fine until the next morning when they are getting out of bed and Mike's ghost attacks them, brutally killing Joey.

Shanks has been watching her all night and comes with a warrant to arrest Joey, claiming he knows he's in there. Marnie says she is taking a shower to buy herself some time to hide the body in the floorboards before Shanks can reach her room. While downstairs talking, the ceiling breaks above them and Joey's body falls through the ceiling. Shanks gets ready to arrest Marnie and take her from the house when Mike's ghost attacks Marnie, throwing her about the room. Stunned by what he sees, Shanks himself is then attacked by Mike's apparition. The ghost then sets the house on fire.

Shanks is thrown down the stairs and Marnie follows, escaping out the window to safety, but returning when she hears Shanks inside awake and searching for her. She helps him out right as Mike's ghost pulls her back through the window. As the two struggle, Marnie removes her ring and throws it at her ex-husband's ghost. The ghost catches it and then disappears in a ball of fire. As a crowd of people begins gathering outside, Shanks tells her to escape. Marnie is then seen on a bus, while a passenger reads a USA Today paper, where the headline proclaims she died in the fire saving Shanks' life.

Cast
 Famke Janssen as Marnie Watson
 Bobby Cannavale as Detective Lou Shanks
 Ed Westwick as Joey DiCenzo
 Michael Paré as Mike Watson
 Patricia Charbonneau as Frances
 Kevin Geer as Father Pritchet

Release 
The film played on Syfy on April 26, 2009.  The DVD was in limited release two days later. It was released nationwide on October 6, 2009 through The Asylum.

Reception 

Brian Collins of Bloody Disgusting rated the film 4/5 stars and said, "Like I’ve said before, I don’t usually find ghosts/supernatural type things to be particularly scary, but this one works."  Steve Barton of Dread Central rated the film 3.5/5 and called it a "surprisingly spooky little flick."

See also
List of ghost films

References

External links 
 
  
 
 
 100 Feet at The Asylum

2008 films
2000s English-language films
2008 horror films
American films about revenge
American supernatural horror films
American ghost films
Films shot in Budapest
Films directed by Eric Red
Syfy original films
The Asylum films
Films scored by John Frizzell (composer)
2000s American films